Norbert Schuler (born 4 November 1938) is a German field hockey player. He competed at the 1960 Summer Olympics and the 1968 Summer Olympics.

References

External links
 

1938 births
Living people
German male field hockey players
Olympic field hockey players of the United Team of Germany
Olympic field hockey players of West Germany
Field hockey players at the 1960 Summer Olympics
Field hockey players at the 1968 Summer Olympics
Sportspeople from Nuremberg
20th-century German people